Kanatbek Kubatovich Begaliev (born 14 February 1984 in Talas, Kyrgyz SSR) is a Kyrgyz wrestler who won the silver medal in the Men's Greco-Roman 66 kg at the 2008 Summer Olympics in Beijing.
After Athens 2004 where he was at 11th place he received invitation to Kazakh national team, which he accepted and also became Kazakhstan citizen. And he trained in Kazakhstan within Kazakh National team until it turned out that to Olympic qualification he was not eligible to represent Kazakhstan yet, and Kanat returned to Kyrgyzstan and qualified to Beijing 2008, where he won Silver medal. Consequently, he said: “Sure, I am always thankful to Kazakhstan, all Kazakh coaches and athletes who believed in me and shared with me their knowledge and skills. I trained there and played with them football. Thus part of this medal belongs to Kazakhstan”

References

External links
 

Living people
Olympic silver medalists for Kyrgyzstan
Olympic wrestlers of Kyrgyzstan
Kyrgyzstani male sport wrestlers
Wrestlers at the 2004 Summer Olympics
Wrestlers at the 2008 Summer Olympics
1984 births
People from Talas, Kyrgyzstan
Olympic medalists in wrestling
Wrestlers at the 2006 Asian Games
Medalists at the 2008 Summer Olympics
World Wrestling Championships medalists
Asian Games competitors for Kyrgyzstan
21st-century Kyrgyzstani people